The Mooloolaba Triathlon is an annual triathlon held since 1993 in Mooloolaba, Queensland, Australia. It is reported to attract up to 4,000 competitors and includes open-water swimming, cycling, and running. USM EVENTS owns and manages the Mooloolaba Triathlon Festival.

The Mooloolaba Triathlon Festival (MTF) celebrated its 20th year in 2012, when it drew about 7,000 individual and team competitors. The Mooloolaba Triathlon is the second-largest Olympic distance triathlon event in Australia.

The Mooloolaba Triathlon is the centrepiece of a three-day multi-sport festival. In addition to attracting international and Australian elite sportspersons, the festival provides a range of opportunities for the ‘not so elite’ athletes, including the Age Group Triathlon, Asics Twilight  Run, the Peregian Springs Mooloolaba Ocean Swim, and for the kids, The Courier-Mail Mooloolaba Superkidz Triathlon. The MTF also hosts a three-day Expo from Friday to Sunday. The Expo is popular with various festival partners and exhibitors showing, promoting and selling their products.

Also staged in conjunction with the festival is the International Triathlon Union Mooloolaba Triathlon World Cup, the only Australian leg of the ITU Triathlon World Cup Series. As the first race of the season, this World Cup event consistently draws thousands of spectators and a talented international field. In 2011, the world’s top triathletes raced for a prize pool totalling US$100,000.

In 2013, the swim leg of the race was moved to the Mooloolah River for safety reasons after Tropical Cyclone Sandra created huge swells.

ITU men

ITU women

See also

Sport in Queensland

References

External links
USM Events
International Triathlon Uninon

Sport in the Sunshine Coast, Queensland
Maroochydore
Sports competitions in Queensland
Triathlon competitions
Recurring sporting events established in 1993
1993 establishments in Australia
Triathlon competitions in Australia